Sweet Lies may refer to:

Sweet Lies (film), a 1988 American film directed by Nathalie Delon
"Sweet Lies" (Robert Palmer song), the title track from the film
"Sweet Lies" (Ellie Campbell song), 1999
"Sweet Lies" (Wilkinson song), 2016
"Sweet Lies", a song by Exo from The War: The Power of Music, 2017